Radek Meidl (born November 25, 1988) is a Czech professional ice hockey player. He is currently playing for Leeds Chiefs of the National Ice Hockey League (NIHL).

Meidl made his Czech Extraliga debut playing with HC Oceláři Třinec during the 2015-16 Czech Extraliga season.

He is the younger brother of Václav Meidl.

References

External links

1988 births
Living people
HC Berounští Medvědi players
Czech ice hockey forwards
HK Dukla Michalovce players
HK Dukla Trenčín players
LHK Jestřábi Prostějov players
Milton Keynes Lightning players
HC Oceláři Třinec players
HC Olomouc players
Orlik Opole players
Sportspeople from Prostějov
TMH Polonia Bytom players
Seattle Thunderbirds players
Hokej Šumperk 2003 players
Tri-City Americans players
Czech expatriate ice hockey players in the United States
Czech expatriate ice hockey players in Slovakia
Czech expatriate sportspeople in England
Czech expatriate sportspeople in Poland
Expatriate ice hockey players in England
Expatriate ice hockey players in Poland